Senator Ramos may refer to:

Bruno Ramos (born 1950), Senate of Puerto Rico
Jessica Ramos (fl. 2010s–2020s), New York State Senate
Oreste Ramos (fl. 1970s–2000s), Senate of Puerto Rico